The 2016 FC Tokyo season was the club's 16th year in existence and fifth consecutive season in the J1 League.

Players

Senior squad

Out on loan

J1 League

League table

Matches

References

External links
 J.League official site

FC Tokyo
FC Tokyo seasons